Bitola is a municipality in the southern part of North Macedonia. Bitola is also the name of the city where the municipal seat is found. The municipality is located in the Pelagonia Statistical Region.

Geography
The municipality of Bitola borders Demir Hisar Municipality to the north, Mogila Municipality to the northeast, Resen Municipality to the west, Novaci to the southeast and Greece to the south.

The municipality extends through the Pelagonia valley reaching the highest points of Baba Mountain. The Black River runs through the municipality.

Demographics

The population of the municipality in 2002 was 105,644.

By the 2003 territorial division of the republic, the rural Bistrica Municipality and Capari Municipality were attached to Bitola Municipality. Without these two municipalities the population of the municipality was 86,176 according to the national census of 1994, and 86,480 at the last census. The population of the defunct Bistrica Municipality in 1994 was 5,779, and according to the last census was 5,042. The population of the former Capari Municipality in 1994 was 1,793, and according to the last census was 1,424.

Inhabited places
The number of the inhabited places in the municipality is 66. There is one city and 65 villages.

References

External links
 Official website

 
Pelagonia Statistical Region
Municipalities of North Macedonia